Dos is the second album by Latin rock band Malo, released in 1972.

Track listing 

 "Momotombo" (Pablo Tellez/Abel Zarate) - 5:06 
 "Oye Mamá" (Arcelio Garcia, Jr./Leo Rosales) - 6:03 
 "I'm For Real" (Arcelio Garcia, Jr./Jorge Santana)  - 6:39 
 "Midnight Thoughts" ( Pablo Tellez) - 3:58 
 "Helá" (Arcelio Garcia, Jr./Francisco Aquabella)  - 5:06 
 "Latin Bugaloo" (Abel Zarate/Arcelio Garcia, Jr.) - 9:31

Personnel 

Arcelio García, Jr.: Vocals, percussion
Jorge Santana: Guitar
Abel Zarate: Guitars, vocals
Pablo Tellez: Bass guitar, percussion
Richard Kermode: Keyboards, electric piano, organ, piano, percussion
Francisco Aquabella: Conga, bongos, percussion, vocals
Hadley Caliman: Tenor & baritone saxophones, flute
Leo Rosales: Timbales, congas, bongos, drums, percussion, vocals
Forrest Buchtel: Trumpet
José Santana: Violin
Alex Rodrigues: Trumpet
George Bermudez: Congas, percussion
Rick Quintanal: Drums
Bobby Ramirez: Drums
Mike Heathman: Trombone
Bill Alwood: Trumpet
Tom Poole: Trumpet
Raul Rekow: Congas
Richard Spremich: Drums
John Watson: backing vocals

Credits
Production, engineering and mixing: David Rubinson.
Recording director: Fred Calero.
Mastering: George Home.
Art direction: Chris Whorf.
Photography: Herb Greene.
Album design: John & Barbara Casado.

Charts
Album - Billboard (US)

References

External links
Discogs entry

1972 albums
Malo albums
Warner Records albums